Citybook III: Deadly Nightside is a universal role-playing game supplement published by Flying Buffalo and distributed by Task Force Games in 1987.

Publication history
Citybook III: Deadly Nightside is a 96-page softcover book, part of Flying Buffalo's Catalyst series of universal role-playing game supplements that can be adapted to any role-playing game system. It was edited by Michael A. Stackpole, with contributions by Greg Gorden, Warren Spector, Allen Varney, Scott Haring, Jennell Jaquays, Jennifer Roberson, Dennis L. McKiernan, and Ed Andrews, and artwork by Liz Danforth. 

Flying Buffalo had ceased most of its role-playing publications in 1985, but had continued to provide Task Force Games with materials to be distributed under license, including Citybook III: Deadly Nightside. As Shannon Applecline commented in the 2014 book Dungeons & Designers: The '70s, "The Catalyst line was given much more attention by Flying Buffalo, even when it was licensed out. Task Force Games reprinted several out-of-print books while Flying Buffalo prepared new releases for them including Grimtooth's Traps Fore (1986), Citybook III: Deadly Nightshade (1987), a new comic book-based Catalyst series called Lejentia Campaigns (1989), and Grimtooth's Traps Ate (1990)."

Contents
Like previous books in the Citybook series, this book details prototypical medieval urban businesses that can be used by referees to flesh out a fantasy role-playing adventure or campaign. 

Eighteen businesses are described, including a temple, a slave-trader's market, a drug den, a brothel, a court of law, a gambling club, and a school for fighters. Each includes detailed floor plans, notable personalities associated with it, and assorted story hooks that can draw characters into an adventure.

Reception
In the January 1988 edition of Dragon (Issue 129), Ken Rolston called this "another volume in the excellent Citybook series of generic FRPG supplements featuring colorful urban establishments with richly imagined and illustrated NPCs and stimulating scenarios." He concluded, "Previous Citybook projects have always been original, offbeat, and well-written; Citybook III is no exception."

Notes

References

External links
Review in Games International

Fantasy role-playing game supplements
Role-playing game supplements introduced in 1987